Gornja Barica is a village in the municipality of Brod, Republika Srpska, Bosnia and Herzegovina.

References

Villages in Republika Srpska
Populated places in Brod, Bosnia and Herzegovina